Power of Darkness is a demonstration album by the music production group Two Steps from Hell, originally released exclusively to clients in the motion picture and advertising industry for the purpose of licensing in March 2010. It was uniquely distributed on a flash drive, rather than a physical disc. It includes 32 principal tracks, split into two themed volumes. Additionally, it contains a large collection of alternative versions; therefore, in total, Power of Darkness consists of 77 tracks. They are composed by Thomas J. Bergersen and Nick Phoenix. The album was recorded in Prague, Czech Republic (by Capellen Orchestra), in Los Angeles, and in Utah, United States. The cover artwork and the sleeve are designed by Steven R. Gilmore.

Some tracks were made available to the general public on subsequent commercial albums, starting with Invincible (2010). In 2017, the album was finally released to the public, albeit modified to consist of only tracks which had still not yet been made commercially available and under the title of Power of Darkness Anthology.

Track listing
Below is the original track listing.

The public re-issue of the album as Power of Darkness Anthology was released on 1 August 2017. Its listing is different to the original – it is most of the remaining tracks which, until its release, were still unavailable for public purchase and arranged in a different order; tracks which had already been released to the public on other commercial albums were excluded. Therefore, Power of Darkness Anthology features 40 tracks and has a total length of 01:39:57. The main versions of "The Soul That Must Awaken" and "Ghost Brigades" were omitted from the release as the group were "just not happy" with them, opting to including their alternatives instead.

Volume 1 – "Epic drama"

Main tracks

Volume 2 – "Action"

Main tracks

Critical reception
IFMCA-associated reviews website, MundoBSO, rated it seven out of ten stars.

Trailer Music News called it "probably the most epic album by Two Steps From Hell" at the time.

Charts
As a demo, the album was not available for public purchase and therefore unable to enter any charts.

However, the re-release of the album as Power of Darkness Anthology in 2017 was a public offering and did chart as follows:

Use in media

Two Steps From Hell's music has been featured frequently in trailers and commercials. 
Master of Shadows was used in for the trailers for 2012 and Abraham Lincoln: Vampire Hunter and in commercials for Harry Potter and the Deathly Hallows – Part 2.
Black Blade was used in trailers for Mass Effect 3, Prince of Persia: The Sands of Time, and Priest, TV spots for Star Trek, X-Men Origins: Wolverine, X-Men: First Class, Harry Potter and the Deathly Hallows – Part 2, Abraham Lincoln: Vampire Hunter and The Book of Eli, and commercials for the video games Homefront, Star Wars: The Old Republic and Binary Domain, as well as trailers for the TV shows The Legend of Korra and Terra Nova.
Invincible was used in a commercial for HBO's Game of Thrones.
Velocitron was used in commercials for Harry Potter and the Deathly Hallows – Part 2 and a commercial for the video game Assassin's Creed Brotherhood.
Titan Dune was used in the theatrical trailer for Prince of Persia: The Sands of Time (film).
Ironwing was used in the launch trailer for Bulletstorm.
Dark Harbor was used in a trailer for Game of Thrones.
Norwegian Pirate was used in the Character Progression trailer for the Smuggler class of Star Wars: The Old Republic.
Magnan Imus was used in the second trailer for the first season of Penny Dreadful (TV series).
Freefall was used for the entrance music of WWE wrestler Daniel Bryan in 2011.

References

External links
 (Anthology only)

2010 albums
Two Steps from Hell albums